Invasive species are a serious threat to the native biodiversity of Colombia, located in northern South America.

Invasive plants and invasive insect pests are an ongoing cost to Colombia agriculture.

See also

References

External links

Invasive species